"Dog and Pony" is the second episode of the American crime comedy-drama television series Terriers. The episode was written by executive producer Shawn Ryan and consulting producer Jed Seidel, and directed by Clark Johnson. It was first broadcast on FX in the United States on September 15, 2010.

The series is set in Ocean Beach, San Diego and focuses on ex-cop and recovering alcoholic Hank Dolworth (Donal Logue) and his best friend, former criminal Britt Pollack (Michael Raymond-James), who both decide to open an unlicensed private investigation business. In the episode, Hank and Britt are forced to pursue a wanted criminal as their money has been taken by the authorities. However, the case proves to be even more complex than expected.

According to Nielsen Media Research, the episode was seen by an estimated 0.822 million household viewers and gained a 0.4/1 ratings share among adults aged 18–49. The episode received extremely positive reviews from critics, who praised the writing, character development, directing, and performances.

Plot
Hank (Donal Logue) and Britt (Michael Raymond-James) are separately interviewed by the authorities, regarding Lindus' arrest. They both claim to not have any involvement in his arrest or incriminating him. Despite receiving $30,000 from Lindus, they can't cash it as it is used as evidence and Lindus' accounts were frozen. Mark (Rockmond Dunbar) reprimands them for their actions.

Needing money, they settle on catching a wanted criminal: Montell Gobright (Matthew Willig), wanted for armed robbery, with a reward of $5,000. In order to lure him out, they intimidate his wife, a fortune teller named Aggatha Hagglethorpe (Jean Villepique), into sharing part of her drug money. He also visits Gretchen (Kimberly Quinn) to confirm that he will buy their old house, despite his Alcoholics Anonymous friend, Barry (Paul Hipp), telling him not to do it.

Hank and Britt visit once again Aggatha, but this time, they are confronted by Montell. Montell brutally attacks them and throws them out of their window before fleeing. Hank and Britt are arrested and bailed out by Mark, warning them to stay away from the case. Despite this, they question Bradley Denham (Nate Mooney), Montell's half-brother and bookkeeper for a race track. Hank suspects that Denham rattled on his brother for some criminal activities. They then intercept a meeting between the brothers, with Denham shooting Montell and fleeing. Hank and Britt arrive to take Montell into their care.

They take him to Britt's house, asking her girlfriend Katie (Laura Allen) to treat him. It is revealed that Denham and Montell worked on a heist in the race track, but Denham kept all of the money. Hank and Britt visit the race track, blackmailing Denham into giving him half of the money in exchange for killing Montell. Denham agrees but Mark suddenly appears, revealing that they were wearing a wire, and Denham is arrested. The heist money is eventually found and Hank and Britt are given the reward money.

Hank, Britt and Katie take Montell with his wife, also letting them keep Britt's dog. Britt decides to adopt Winston, the bulldog he previously rescued. With the money, Hank pays Gretchen for the old house. After doing it, he takes a sledgehammer to take down a wall in the house, as part of a promise he made to Gretchen when they first moved into the house.

Reception

Viewers
The episode was watched by 0.822 million viewers, earning a 0.4/1 in the 18-49 rating demographics on the Nielson ratings scale. This means that 0.4 percent of all households with televisions watched the episode, while 1 percent of all households watching television at that time watched it. This was a 49% decrease in viewership from the previous episode, which was watched by 1.61 million viewers with a 0.5/2 in the 18-49 rating demographics.

Critical reviews
"Dog and Pony" received extremely positive reviews from critics. Noel Murray of The A.V. Club gave the episode an "A-" grade and wrote, "Beyond the opening scene and a few stray mentions, 'Dog And Pony' doesn't move the Lindus storyline forward much. The episode is designed more to flesh out the world of Terriers, and to that end, the most significant scene in 'Dog And Pony' comes late, when Gustafson pulls Britt aside after the whole adventure is done in order to have a little chat about Hank."

Alan Sepinwall of HitFix wrote, "Regardless of where the Lindus story is going, we need to care about these two guys, and Hank's decision to smash down the hated wall – too late to save his marriage, but just in time to take away his option to back out of the purchase – was a moment where the stakes were as high for him as when he threatened to take down Lindus in the pilot."

Matt Richenthal of TV Fanatic gave the episode a 4.4 star rating out of 5 and wrote, "Episodes such as 'Dog and Pony' give us insight into their pasts, their relationships, their personalities and more. From there, the show can build more interesting cases around a pair of well-established individuals. I'm very much on board." Cory Barker of TV Overmind wrote, "After a fantastic pilot episode, 'Dog and Pony' proves that Terriers is going to be a must-watch new series this fall. The episode is fairly standalone in nature with only a few mentions of the Lindus case that Hank and Britt are now the prime witnesses in, but spending 45 minutes with these two guys and this world is beyond enough to sustain my enjoyment."

References

External links
 

2010 American television episodes
Terriers episodes
Television episodes directed by Clark Johnson